412 Days of Rock 'n' Roll is a live album and DVD by Northern Irish rock band The Answer, released on 13 June 2011. The DVD features a documentary following the band's stint as a support act on AC/DC's Black Ice World Tour. According to lead singer Cormac Neeson, the band played 118 shows with AC/DC and "as many of our own headline shows and radio sessions as we could squeeze into the schedule." The DVD also includes an approximately 60 minute-long live set, which also features on the CD, and all of the band's nine promo videos. In addition to the live set, the CD features a cover of Rose Tattoo's "Rock 'n' Roll Outlaw" and a previously unreleased demo track.

Track listing
All songs written by James Heatley, Paul Mahon, Cormac Neeson and Micky Waters, except where noted.

Personnel
The Answer
Cormac Neeson — lead vocals, harmonica
Paul Mahon — guitars, vocals
Micky Waters — bass, vocals
James Heatley — drums, vocals

Production
Nick Arthur — editing
Paul Hussey — producer
Barry Barnes — director
James Cassidy — executive producer
Declan Maynes — compiling, editing, project co-ordination
Paul 'Pab' Boothroyd — recording (tracks 1-5)
Dan Dabrowski — recording (tracks 1-9)
Guillermo 'Will' Maya — mixing (tracks 1-9)
Shawn Joseph — mastering
The Answer — recording, production (tracks 10-11)
Neal Calderwood — recording, production (tracks 10-11), mixing (track 11)
Mike Fraser — mixing (track 10)

References

2011 video albums
2011 live albums
The Answer (band) albums